This is a list of some of the modern orders, decorations and medals of France. Some like the Legion of Honour are awarded to both the armed forces and civilians. Others are decorations of a pure civilian or military character. Only four of the 19 Ministerial orders have survived the reform of the French system of decorations in 1963. The others were replaced by the Ordre national du Mérite.

The Grand Chancery of the Legion of Honour classifies the national system of honours of France into two categories: those honours awarded on behalf of the President of the Republic and ministerial honours. The orders and decorations presented on behalf of the president are the Legion of Honour, Order of Liberation, Military Medal, National Order of Merit, and National Medal of Recognition for victims of terrorism. The ministerial honours include French military decorations, the existing ministerial orders, ministerial awards for acts of courage and honor medals, and commemorative medals.

National orders

Ministerial orders

Military decorations

Rewards for acts of courage and ministerial honour medals

Commemorative medals

19th century

1900–1914

First World War (1914–1918)

Between the two wars (1918–1939)

Second World War (1939–1945)

After 1945

Territorial order

Abolished or dormant decorations

Royal orders

Ministerial orders

Colonial orders

Rewards for acts of courage and ministerial honour medals

See also
 Historical orders, decorations, and medals of France
 Ribbons of the French military and civil awards
 List of honours of France awarded to heads of state and royalty

References

 
Military awards and decorations of France
Civil awards and decorations of France